"The Note" is the 18th episode of Seinfeld. It is the first episode of the show's third season. It aired on September 18, 1991.

Plot
During a physical therapy massage, Jerry frightens his therapist by talking about a small boy who was kidnapped in Pennsylvania, suggesting that he could also be a deranged kidnapper, and then asking questions about the therapist's own son. George later becomes very uncomfortable when he is assigned a man as his masseur, fearing the massage might turn into a homosexual experience. He tells Jerry that he felt the beginnings of an erection during the massage. The two of them discuss whether or not this means George is homosexual, with Jerry arguing the con position.

Kramer claims he saw Joe DiMaggio in Dinky Donuts but the others do not believe him. According to Kramer, DiMaggio was a very focused eater—the same way he used to play; to prove his point, he made noises (such as banging the table and yelping), which DiMaggio ignored. George convinces Jerry to ask his dentist Roy for a note, allowing the group to secure free massages. In Roy's office, George's insecurity over his sexuality resurfaces when Roy asks for his opinion of Evander Holyfield. Roy later comes under investigation for passing around fake notes. Jerry tries to see the physical therapist once more, but she refuses because she's afraid he will kidnap her son.

While eating in Monk's, Jerry, George, Elaine, and Kramer all see Joe DiMaggio dunking his donuts. Kramer once again bangs the table and yelps to demonstrate DiMaggio's unbreakable concentration.

Theme song
This was the only episode - other than the original pilot - with a different version of the theme song. Female singers harmonize over the iconic slap-bass tune, an addition made by composer Jonathan Wolff at the request of Jerry Seinfeld, who wanted to add "a little sparkle" to the music, suggesting the addition of some scat lyrics. Seinfeld and executive producer Larry David both liked Wolff's additions, and three episodes were produced with the new style music. However, they had neglected to inform NBC and Castle Rock of the change, and when the season premiere aired, the latter were surprised and unimpressed, and requested that they return to the original style. The subsequent two episodes were redone, leaving this episode as the only one with the additional music elements. Since this episode's end credits played "Joltin' Joe DiMaggio" in place of the theme tune, the full version of the revised theme was never used.

References

External links 

Seinfeld (season 3) episodes
1991 American television episodes
Television episodes written by Larry David